Arttu Pelli (born 22 August 1996) is a Finnish ice hockey defenceman currently playing for KooKoo of the Finnish Liiga.

References

External links
 

1996 births
Living people
KooKoo players
Finnish ice hockey defencemen
People from Kouvola
Sportspeople from Kymenlaakso